Muhammadganj is a community development bank located in Palamu, District of Jharkhand State in India. There are total 43 Revenue Villages in Mohammadganj Block, Mohammadganj alias Mohsin Nagar is also a village in the list of these villages, which is a village as well as a Panchayat.
There is tourist palace is called Bhim Chulha, located beside the bank of North Koel River nearby North Koel River Barrage also named as Bheem Barrage..

Schools in Mohammadganj
 Upgraded High School, Station Road
 N K P High School, Colony
 Shishu Shiksha Mandir School, Mohammadganj

References

Cities and towns in Palamu district